Peddapalle Assembly constituency is a constituency of Telangana Legislative Assembly, India. It is one of 13 constituencies in Karimnagar district. It is part of Peddapalle Lok Sabha constituency.

Dasari Manohar Reddy of Telangana Rashtra Samithi won the 2019 election with over majority of 8,000 votes.

Mandals
The Assembly Constituency presently comprises the following Mandals:

Members of Legislative Assembly

Election results

Telangana Legislative Assembly election, 2018

Telangana Legislative Assembly election, 2014

See also
 List of constituencies of Telangana Legislative Assembly

References

Assembly constituencies of Telangana
Karimnagar district